Wang Xiaole (born 8 January 1997) is a Chinese footballer who currently plays for China League Two side Zhuhai Qin'ao.

Club career
Wang Xiaole joined Chinese Super League side Beijing Guoan's youth academy in September 2011. He was promoted to the first team squad by Roger Schmidt in 2018. On 29 April 2018, he made his senior debut in a 4–3 home win against Guizhou Hengfeng, coming on as a substitute for Jonathan Viera in the 89th minute.

Career statistics

References

External links
 

1997 births
Living people
Chinese footballers
Association football midfielders
Footballers from Wuhan
Beijing Guoan F.C. players
Chinese Super League players
21st-century Chinese people